Lithuanian University of Health Sciences (LSMU) is a medical school in Kaunas, Lithuania. The present-day Lithuanian University of Health Sciences is a consolidation of two institutions of higher education, Kaunas University of Medicine and the Lithuanian Veterinary Academy. It uses the Hospital of Lithuanian University of Health Sciences Kaunas Clinics and the Kaunas Red Cross Hospital as teaching hospitals.

History
It was founded in 2010 by merging Kaunas University of Medicine and the Lithuanian Veterinary Academy.
In 2013, Secondary school of Lithuanian University of Health Sciences was established in Vilijampolė district of Kaunas.

Medical Academy
Medical Academy of the Lithuanian University of Health Sciences was founded in 1919 and from 1922 it was a Faculty of Medicine of University of Lithuania. It is located in the center of Kaunas.

In 1950, after the closure of Kaunas University, it was reformed into a separate institution and was known as Kaunas Medical Institute until 1998. From 1998 to 2010 its name was Kaunas University of Medicine. In 2010 university was merged with Lithuanian Veterinary Academy forming Lithuanian University of Health Sciences. Medical faculties were concentrated to Medical Academy.

Lithuanian University of Health Sciences Medical Academy has 5 faculties:
 Faculty of Medicine
 Faculty of Odontology
 Faculty of Pharmacy
 Faculty of Nursing
 Faculty of Public Health

Homeopathy
University's own pharmacy manufactures and actively promotes homeopathic medicines. Daiva Majiene, university's professor in medical technology, actively promotes homeopathy with various publications and claims that there are more than 5000 studies which prove homeopathy's effectiveness.

Veterinary Academy 
The academy began its history in 1922 as the Veterinary department under the Faculty of Medicine in Kaunas University. In 1929 the department closed due to lack of funds, but was able to re-open in 1936. In spring of 1943, the LVA, along with other institutions of higher education in Lithuania, was closed. During the postwar period teaching and administrative staff experienced difficulties stemming from a lack of experienced teachers, text books and electricity. In the spring of 1946, a flood destroyed part of existing laboratories, buildings, and all laboratory animals. The academy recovered; in 1974 a scientific sector was established, and the number of students as well as teaching and scientific staff increased. In 2001 the Lithuanian Veterinary Institute and the Lithuanian Institute of Animal Science were incorporated into the Academy's structure. In 2010 the academy was merged with the Kaunas University of Medicine to form the Lithuanian University of Health Sciences. The academy is located in Vilijampolė district, Kaunas.

Teaching facilities at the Veterinary Academy include 12 scientific laboratories, acting under the departments; the Continuing Education Centre; and a library.

Research facilities at the Academy include the Milking Training Centre; the Practical Instruction and Research Centre; the Teaching Farm, which issues healthy herd certificates; the Modern Cold Storage Farm (with teaching rooms); Large and Small Animal Clinics; the Laboratory of Livestock Carcass Classification; Mobile Ambulatory Clinics; and 12 research laboratories.

Lithuanian University of Health Sciences Veterinary Academy has 2 faculties:
 Faculty of Veterinary Medicine
 Faculty of Animal Husbandry Technology

Organizations of LUHS 

Students' Union, KIMSU, Ave vita, SOA, SMD, Choir of LUHS "Neris", LiMSA, Fraternitas Lituanica, Gaja, SFD, VASA, Juventus, Džigūnas, Kupolė.

References

External links
Official university webpage
Official webpage of the Veterinary Academy

Universities in Lithuania
Medical schools in Lithuania
Education in Kaunas
Buildings and structures in Kaunas
Educational institutions established in 2010
2010 establishments in Lithuania
Universities and colleges formed by merger
Veterinary schools in Lithuania